These hits topped the Ultratop 50 in the Flanders region of Belgium in 1989.

See also
1989 in music

References

1989 in Belgium
1989 record charts
1989